John Howard van de Ruit  (born 20 April 1975) is a South African novelist, actor, playwright and producer. He has been a professional actor, playwright and producer since 1998. He was born in Durban and educated at Michaelhouse, where he stayed in Founders House and from where he matriculated in 1993. He then went on to complete a master's degree in Drama and Performance at the then University of Natal.

He is best known for his collaboration with Ben Voss on the satirical sketch show Green Mamba which has toured extensively throughout Southern Africa since 2002. His first novel was published in 2005 by Penguin, entitled Spud. The book was a runaway success in South Africa. It won the 2006 Bookseller's Choice Award. The sequel Spud - The Madness Continues... was released in mid-2007. The third book Spud - Learning to Fly was released on 10 June 2009. The first book Spud has also been recorded as an audio book, read by the author. The 4th book Spud: Exit, Pursued by a Bear was released in 2012 on the 4th of August.

Following the sale of the rights to film producer Ross Garland, the film Spud - the Movie was shot between March and April 2010, and released on 3 December 2010. Van der Ruit portrays the teacher, Mr Lennox, in a cameo role.

References

External links
 The author reading from 'Spud - Learning to Fly'
 Interview with John van de Ruit and Ben Voss about the comedy 'Green Mamba'
 Publisher's Biography Page
 Interview Alec Hogg (MoneyWeb) interviews John (8 August 2012)

Alumni of Michaelhouse
Living people
1975 births
University of Natal alumni
South African dramatists and playwrights
South African male novelists
South African male stage actors
Writers from Durban
Male dramatists and playwrights
Actors from Durban